In chemistry, an oxocarbon anion is a negative ion consisting solely of carbon and oxygen atoms, and therefore having the general formula  for some integers x, y, and n.

The most common oxocarbon anions are carbonate, and oxalate, . There is however a large number of stable anions in this class, including several ones that have research or industrial use.

Stable oxocarbon anions form salts with a large variety of cations.  Unstable anions may persist in very rarefied gaseous state, such as in interstellar clouds.  Most oxocarbon anions have corresponding moieties in organic chemistry, whose compounds are usually esters.  Thus, for example, the oxalate moiety  occurs in the ester dimethyl oxalate .

Electronic structure of the carbonate ion 

The carbonate ion has a trigonal planar structure, point group D3h. The three C-O bonds have the same length of 136 pm and the 3 O-C-O angles are 120°. The carbon atom has 4 pairs of valence electrons, which shows that the molecule obeys the octet rule. This is one factor that contributes to the high stability of the ion, which occurs in rocks such as limestone. The electronic structure is described by two main theories which are used to show how the 4 electron pairs are distributed in a molecule that only has 3 C-O bonds.

With valence bond theory the electronic structure of the carbonate ion is a resonance hybrid of 3 canonical forms.
 
In each canonical form there are two single bonds one double bond. The three canonical forms contribute equally to the resonance hybrid, so the three bond C-O bonds have the same length.  

With molecular orbital theory the 3-fold axis is designated as the z axis of the molecule. Three σ bonds are formed overlap of the s, px and py orbitals on the carbon atom with a p orbital on each oxygen atom. In addition, a delocalized π bond is made by overlap of the pz orbital on the carbon atom with the pz orbital on each oxygen atom which is perpendicular to the plane of the molecule.

Note that the same bonding schemes may be applied the nitrate ion, NO3−, which is isoelectronic with the carbonate ion.

Similarly, the two-fold symmetrical structure of a carboxylate group,, may be described as a resonance hybrid of two canonical forms in valence bond theory, or with 2 σ bonds and a delocalized π bond in molecular orbital theory.

Related compounds

Oxocarbon acids
An oxocarbon anion  can be seen as the result of removing all protons from a corresponding acid CxHnOy. Carbonate , for example, can be seen as the anion of carbonic acid H2CO3.  Sometimes the "acid" is actually an alcohol or other species; this is the case, for example, of acetylenediolate  that would yield acetylenediol C2H2O2.  However, the anion is often more stable than the acid (as is the case for carbonate); and sometimes the acid is unknown or is expected to be extremely unstable (as is the case of methanetetracarboxylate C(COO−)4).

Neutralized species
Every oxocarbon anion  can be matched in principle to the electrically neutral (or oxidized) variant CxOy, an oxocarbon (oxide of carbon) with the same composition and structure except for the negative charge. As a rule, however, these neutral oxocarbons are less stable than the corresponding anions.  Thus, for example, the stable carbonate anion corresponds to the extremely unstable neutral carbon trioxide CO3; oxalate  correspond to the even less stable 1,2-dioxetanedione C2O4; and the stable croconate anion  corresponds to the neutral cyclopentanepentone C5O5, which has been detected only in trace amounts.

Reduced variants
Conversely, some oxocarbon anions can be reduced to yield other anions with the same structural formula but greater negative charge.  Thus rhodizonate  can be reduced to the  tetrahydroxybenzoquinone (THBQ) anion  and then to benzenehexolate .

Acid anhydrides
An oxocarbon anion  can also be associated with the anhydride of the corresponding acid.  The latter would be another oxocarbon with formula CxOy−; namely, the acid minus  water molecules H2O.  The standard example is the connection between carbonate  and carbon dioxide  CO2. The correspondence is not always well-defined since there may be several ways of performing this formal dehydration, including joining two or more anions to make an oligomer or polymer.  Unlike neutralization, this formal dehydration sometimes yields fairly stable oxocarbons, such as mellitic anhydride C12O9 from mellitate  via mellitic acid C12H6O12

Hydrogenated anions
For each oxocarbon anion  there are in principle n−1 partially hydrogenated anions with formulas , where k ranges from 1 to n−1.  These anions are generally indicated by the prefixes "hydrogen"-, "dihydrogen"-, "trihydrogen"-, etc. Some of them, however, have special names: hydrogencarbonate  is commonly called bicarbonate, and hydrogenoxalate  is known as binoxalate.

The hydrogenated anions may be stable even if the fully protonated acid is not (as is the case of bicarbonate).

List of oxocarbon anions

Here is an incomplete list of the known or conjectured oxocarbon anions

See also
 Oxocarbon
 Silicate
 Sodium percarbonate (actually a carbonate perhydrate)

References

Oxyanions
Oxocarbons